This includes a list of airports in Odisha, India, including commercially used airfields, former airfields, flying schools and military bases. This list contains the following information:
This list contains the following information:
 City served - The city generally associated with the airport. This is not always the actual location since some airports are located in smaller towns outside the city they serve.
 ICAO - The location indicator assigned by the International Civil Aviation Organization (ICAO).
 IATA - The airport code assigned by the International Air Transport Association (IATA).
 Airport name - The official airport name. Those shown in bold indicate the airport has scheduled service on commercial airlines.
 Note - Specific information related to the airport

List

References 

Odisha
 
Buildings and structures in Odisha
Odisha-related lists